Rockingham station was a railway station in Rockingham, Nova Scotia, Canada. It was located near Mount Saint Vincent University and was originally operated by the Canadian National Railway and later Via Rail. In the 1970s and 1980s, it was served by Budd Rail Diesel Car passenger trains operated by CN and later Via until the end of RDC service in Nova Scotia in 1990.

References

Via Rail stations in Nova Scotia
Transport in Halifax, Nova Scotia
Buildings and structures in Halifax, Nova Scotia